Robert Eugene Ladouceur (born July 3, 1954) is a retired American football coach. He began coaching the De La Salle High Spartans in Concord, California in 1979, when he was 25 years old. He took over a program that had never enjoyed a winning season since the school's establishment in 1965. His first season as head coach resulted in their first winning season. His second season resulted in their first appearance in the California Prep Football State Rankings and began De La Salle's evolution into a perennial champion. From 1992 to 2004, he guided the team to 12 consecutive undefeated seasons, setting a national winning streak record for high school football of 151 consecutive wins—a record in US amateur sports matched only by the 159-game winning streak of Passaic High School in men's basketball, and the 459 match win streak of Brandon High School in men's wrestling. Ladouceur was enshrined to the National High School Hall of Fame in 2001. His team has topped the USA Today rankings five times and he is a three-time coach of the year. He retired on January 4, 2013 with a career record of 399–25–3. His .934 winning percentage is a record among coaches with 200 or more wins. Ladouceur is the all-time winningest coach in California high school football and has led the De La Salle program to numerous championships.
A film about his life was released on August 22, 2014.  When the Game Stands Tall is a 2014 sports drama film. The film, which stars Jim Caviezel as Coach Bob Ladouceur, Laura Dern as Bev Ladouceur, Michael Chiklis as assistant coach Terry Eidson and Alexander Ludwig as running back Chris Ryan, is about the record-setting 151-game 1992–2003 high school football winning streak by De La Salle High School of Concord, California. The film is an adaptation of the 2003 book of the same name by Neil Hayes, published by North Atlantic Books. Bob married Lissa Ladouceur on January 3, 2015. De La Salle head coach Bob Ladouceur retired in January 2013 after winning his last Open Division state championship in December 2012.

Championships & Record
National championships (11):
1994 (ESPN),
1998 (USA Today),
1999 (National Sports News Service),
2000 (USA Today), 2001 (USA Today), 2002 (USA Today), 2003  (USA Today) Calpreps 2009, 2010, 2011, 2012

California State Bowl championships (5):
2007, 2009, 2010, 2011, 2012

CIF North Coast section championships (28):
1982, 1984, 1985, 1986, 1988, 1989, 1990, 1992, 1993, 1994, 1995, 1996, 1997, 1998, 1999, 2000, 2001, 2002, 2003, 2004, 2005, 2006, 2007, 2008, 2009, 2010, 2011, 2012

East Bay league championships (5):
2008, 2009, 2010, 2011, 2012

Bay Valley League championships (11):
1988, 1989, 1990, 1991, 1992, 1993, 1994, 1995, 1996, 1997, 1998

Golden Bay League championships (2):
1986, 1987

Catholic League championships (3):
1982, 1983, 1984

Notable players and assistant coaches
 Cameron Colvin, former wide receiver for Oregon Ducks
 T. J. Ward, defensive back formerly for Cleveland Browns, Denver Broncos and Tampa Bay Buccaneers
 Terron Ward, Running back formerly with Atlanta Falcons, Arizona Hotshots and Salt Lake Stallions
 Jackie Bates, Running back formerly with Kansas City Chiefs and San Jose SaberCats
 Maurice Jones-Drew, running back formerly with Jacksonville Jaguars and Oakland Raiders
 Kevin Simon, linebacker formerly with Washington Redskins, current scout for Cowboys
 Matt Gutierrez, quarterback formerly with New England Patriots, Kansas City Chiefs, Chicago Bears, Omaha Nighthawks, Washington Redskins, St. Louis Rams, Arizona Rattlers and Kansas City Command
 D. J. Williams, outside linebacker formerly with Denver Broncos and Chicago Bears
 Doug Brien, placekicker formerly with San Francisco 49ers, New Orleans Saints, Indianapolis Colts, Tampa Bay Buccaneers, Minnesota Vikings, New York Jets and Chicago Bears
 David Loverne, guard formerly with New York Jets, Washington Redskins, St. Louis Rams, Detroit Lions and Houston Texans
 Derek Landri, defensive tackle formerly with Jacksonville Jaguars, Carolina Panthers, Philadelphia Eagles, and Tampa Bay Buccaneers
 Steve Alexakos, assistant line coach (1991–1994), guard for Denver Broncos and New York Giants
 Amani Toomer, wide receiver formerly for the New York Giants and the Kansas City Chiefs
 Aaron Taylor, offensive guard formerly for the Green Bay Packers
 Demetrius Williams, wide receiver formerly with Baltimore Ravens, Cleveland Browns, Jacksonville Jaguars and Sacramento Mountain Lions
 Austin Hooper, Tight End for Cleveland Browns

References

External links
Legends of HS football: Bob Ladouceur

1954 births
Living people
American football running backs
San Jose State Spartans football players
Utah Utes football players
High school football coaches in California
Sportspeople from Detroit
Players of American football from Detroit